Charles Moran Jr. (May 27, 1906 – June 7, 1978) was an American racecar driver and managing partner of Francis I. DuPont, brokerage firm.

Early life
He was born in New York City, son of Charles Moran, a naval historian, and Martha Adams.

He attended St. George's School in Middletown, Rhode Island, and Princeton University before graduating from Columbia University.

Career
In 1928, driving a "Rally" (Automobiles Rally - Colombes), he finished 4th in the 24-hour race at St. Germain-en-Laye (France) the "VII° Bol d'Or" driving the full 24 hours without relief. For the next year and a half he campaigned this car in Spa, San Sebastian, Madrid, Geisberg. He was the first American to race at Le Mans in 1929, in a DuPont, with co-driver Alfredo Luis Miranda; he raced the same car at Indianapolis in 1930 with George Reed in the mechanics seat.

In 1932, he gave up racing, joined DuPont Motors as an engineer, and then moved to a related enterprise, the brokerage firm of Francis I. DuPont, where he became managing partner in the 1950s.   In 1949 he resumed racing, this time in sports cars (Bugatti, MGs, Cunninghams, AC Bristol, Lotus, Ferrari) in SCCA events and again at Le Mans, with his Ferrari 212 (1951, finishing 16th, 1952 DNF) and with his Cunningham C4Rx coupe, co-driver John Gordon Bennett (1953, finishing 10th).

He became Secretary of the Sports Car Club of America in 1952-3 and President in 1954-5. He was a member of the Commission Sportive Internationale and the American representative at the Fédération Internationale de l'Automobile.

In 1956 the American Automobile Association ended its relationship as the sole motorsport organization affiliated with the Fédération Internationale de l'Automobile which governed international racing. As a result, the U.S. no longer had an association with FIA and hence no international racing licenses could be issued, international landspeed records could be certified, or US events be FIA sanctioned' which would put international drivers competing in them at risk of losing their FIA licenses.  Only Indy and Sebring retained their FIA licenses.

Moran took it upon himself to organize the Automobile Competition Committee for the United States (ACCUS) to overcome rivalries between SCCA, USAC and NASCAR clubs and have one umbrella entity to work with the FIA.  He became the first president of ACCUS and managed it skillfully in its early years and led the negotiating with the FIA for US affiliation.  FIA recognized ACCUS in 1957.

He chaired the Board of Trustees at St. George's School 1958-62.

Indy 500 results

Personal life
In February 1936, he married Josephine D. Taylor, daughter of David H. Taylor of 875 Park Avenue in New York City. Together, they had two children:

 Charles Moran III (b. 1936), who served in the O.S.S.in England and France in 1944-5.
 David Taylor Moran (b. 1940).

He later married Hesteranne Primrose Butz; they had 3 children:

 Martha Adams Moran (b. 1962)
 Amedee Depau Moran (b. 1963)
 Helen Moran. Charles Moran Jr.

Moran died on June 7, 1978 in Teasdale, Utah.

References

1906 births
1978 deaths
Princeton University alumni
Indianapolis 500 drivers
Racing drivers from New York City
Columbia University alumni
St. George's School (Rhode Island) alumni